Čermná may refer to the following places in the Czech Republic:
 Čermná (Domažlice District), a village in the Plzeň Region 
 Čermná (Trutnov District), a village in the Hradec Králové Region
 Čermná nad Orlicí, a village in the Hradec Králové Region
 Čermná ve Slezsku, a village in the Moravian-Silesian Region
 Česká Čermná, a village in the Hradec Králové Region 
 Dolní Čermná, a village in the Pardubice Region 
 Horní Čermná, a village in the Pardubice Region

See also 
 Czermna (disambiguation)